George Robert Godsey (born January 1, 1979) is an American football coach and former player who is the tight ends coach for the Baltimore Ravens of the National Football League (NFL). He previously served as an assistant coach for the Miami Dolphins, Detroit Lions, Houston Texans and New England Patriots, and as the co-offensive coordinator and sole offensive coordinator for the Dolphins and Texans, respectively.

Godsey played quarterback in college at Georgia Tech, where he holds several school records, and for one season in the Arena Football League (AFL) before becoming a coach. He first coached at Central Florida and then the NFL's New England Patriots before joining the Texans, Lions, and Dolphins, all of whom were coached by former Belichick assistants: Bill O'Brien, Matt Patricia, and Brian Flores respectively.

Early life
Godsey was born in Winston-Salem, North Carolina, on January 1, 1979. Both of his brothers played college football. His older brother Greg played at Air Force and his younger brother Gary played at Notre Dame.  He grew up in Tampa, Florida, and attended Jesuit High School.

Playing career

College
Godsey played under George O'Leary at Georgia Tech.  He served as a back-up his freshman and sophomore years, before winning the starting job entering his junior year.  In his first year as a starter in 2000, Godsey threw for 2,906 yards and 23 touchdowns; he also had the sixth best passing efficiency in the country.  The team went 9-2 that year and made it to the Peach Bowl, where Godsey tore his ACL.

In 2001 as a senior, he completed 241 passes for 3,085 yards, both of which are school records.  His final college game was a victory in the Seattle Bowl against 11th-ranked Stanford.  He was named the game's MVP after passing for 226 yards and a touchdown.

Godsey finished his college career as the most accurate passer in Georgia Tech history, with a career completion percentage of 63.3 He also has the third most passing touchdowns in school history with 41.

Godsey was an exceptional student at Georgia Tech, specifically excelling within the field of computer science, where he was tutored by future Google Product Manager Ricky Jashnani.

Arena League
Godsey spent the 2003 Arena Football League season on the Tampa Bay Storm. The team wound up winning ArenaBowl XVII.

Coaching career

High school
In 2003, Godsey coached quarterbacks at The Lovett School in Atlanta, GA under legendary coach Bill Railey. While the team is traditionally considered to be a private school power-house in Georgia High School Football, the Lions struggled in 2003, though they did make the playoffs.

College
Central Florida hired Godsey as a graduate assistant in 2004.  He was reunited with O'Leary who took over the Knights that year. In 2005, he was promoted to quarterbacks coach and served in that role through the 2008 season. In 2009 and 2010, he coached running backs. In the seven years Godsey spent at UCF, the Knights won two Conference USA championships.

Patriots
On February 17, 2011, Godsey was hired by the New England Patriots as an offensive assistant, after the team's prior offensive assistant Brian Ferentz was named tight ends coach.  The move reunited him with Bill O'Brien, New England's offensive coordinator who held the same position with Georgia Tech in 2001 while Godsey was the starting quarterback. He was named tight ends coach for the Patriots in 2012.

Texans
In February 2014, he joined new Houston Texans coach Bill O'Brien as quarterbacks coach. The following year he was promoted to the team’s offensive coordinator. Godsey was let go by the Texans after the 2016 season.

Lions
On February 21, 2017, the Detroit Lions hired Godsey as a defensive assistant/special projects. On February 7, 2018, Godsey was named quarterbacks coach of the Lions. 2 days earlier, the Lions hired Godsey's former colleague from New England, Matt Patricia, as their new head coach. Patricia and Godsey served as assistant coaches for the Patriots from 2011-2013.

Dolphins
On February 8, 2019, the Miami Dolphins hired Godsey as their tight ends coach, reuniting Godsey with new Dolphins head coach Brian Flores, whom served as the Patriots' defensive assistant and Safeties' coach between the 2011 and 2013 seasons, while Godsey served as New England's offensive assistant and tight ends' coach during those seasons. Godsey received an additional title of co-offensive coordinator on March 11, 2021.

Ravens
On February 10, 2022 it was announced that Godsey was becoming the Ravens new tight ends coach.

See also 

 List of Georgia Tech Yellow Jackets starting quarterbacks
 Georgia Tech Yellow Jackets football statistical leaders

References

External links
 Miami Dolphins profile
 New England Patriots profile

1979 births
Living people
American football quarterbacks
Detroit Lions coaches
Georgia Tech Yellow Jackets football players
Houston Texans coaches
Jesuit High School (Tampa) alumni
Miami Dolphins coaches
National Football League offensive coordinators
New England Patriots coaches
Players of American football from Tampa, Florida
Tampa Bay Storm players
UCF Knights football coaches
Players of American football from Winston-Salem, North Carolina
Baltimore Ravens coaches